Acrodipsas aurata, the golden ant-blue, is a butterfly of the family Lycaenidae. It is found in the mountains of New South Wales and northern Victoria in Australia.

The wingspan is about 25 mm.

External links
Australian Caterpillars

Acrodipsas
Butterflies of Australia
Butterflies described in 1997